Tabebuia dubia is a species of plant in the family Bignoniaceae. It is endemic to Cuba.  It is threatened by habitat loss.

References

dubia
Vulnerable plants
Endemic flora of Cuba
Taxonomy articles created by Polbot